Merimasku is a former municipality of Finland. It was, together with Rymättylä and Velkua, consolidated with the town of Naantali on January 1, 2009.

It is located in the province of Western Finland and is part of the Southwest Finland region. The municipality had a population of 1,513 (31 December 2004) and covered an area of 51.12 km² (excluding sea) of which 0.71 km² is inland water. The population density was 30.01 inhabitants per km².

The municipality was unilingually suomi.

References

External links

http://www.merimasku.fi/ – Official website 

Former municipalities of Finland
Naantali
Populated places disestablished in 2009
2009 disestablishments in Finland